Fathimath Shafeega (Dhivehi: ފާތިމަތް
ޝަފީގާ) (b. September 21, 1963), commonly known as Shafeega, is the former chief executive officer of the Capital Market Development Authority in the Maldives.

Education
Shafeega received her secondary school education in Aminiya School, Malé, Maldives and later received her master's degree from Monash University, Melbourne, Australia.

External links
www.cmda.gov.mv Official website of the CMDA (Maldives)
www.maldivesstockexchange.com.mv (Official website for the stock exchange)
www.msd.gov.mv (Maldives Securities Depository)

Maldivian businesspeople
Living people
Year of birth missing (living people)